Roskilde Festival 2007 was held 5 –8 July 2007 with warm-up and camping from 1 July. The stages Metropol and Ballroom were replaced by two new stages, Astoria and Cosmopol. On 4 June 2007 the festival's website announced that the festival was sold out.

2007 was the wettest year in the history of the festival with almost  of rain falling, which meant that large lakes formed in the camping and festival areas. This is also more than double the amount of rain that fell during the festival in 1997, the year which was previously the worst in terms of rain. Furthermore, half the entire amount of rain came on Thursday the 5th of July, a day which saw rain without stop from early morning till approximately midnight. The extreme weather meant that somewhere around 5000 people left the festival early while many more chose to leave the festival in the night and return to catch shows the following morning for the rest of the festival.

Band list

 120 Days (N)
 1234 (DK)
 Thirty Seconds to Mars (US)
 Against Me! (US)
 AGF (D)
 Mahmoud Ahmed (ETH)
 Morten Alick (DK)
 Allan Skov Soulclub (DK)
 Analogik (DK)
 Annuals (US)
 Anthony B (US)
 Arcade Fire (CAN) (Thursday)
 Arctic Monkeys (UK) (Sunday)
 The Ark (S)
 Aronas (NZ)
 As In Rebekkamaria (DK)
 Asle (DK)
 Atoi (DK)
 Badun (DK)
 Band Ane (DK)
 Basement Jaxx (UK)
 Beastie Boys (US) (Friday)
 Beirut (US)
 BigBang (N)
 Björk (ISL) (Thursday)
 Blacksmith presents Talib Kweli og Jean Grae (US)
 Blood Sweat Drum'n'Bass Big Band (DK)
 Bonde Do Role (BRA)
 Booka Shade (D)
 Booty Cologne (DK)
 Boris (JAP)
 The Brian Jonestown Massacre (US)
 The Broken Beats (DK)
 Bukada Som Sistema (PT)
 Camera Obscura (SCO)
 Cansei de Ser Sexy aka. CSS (BRA)
 Carion/Svin: Blowbeat (DK)
 Chillopophy Music presents DJ Nanda og Solead (CHL/F)
 Choir of Young Believers (DK)
 DJ Click (F)
 Clipse (US)
 The Congos (JAM)
 Cult of Luna (S)
 Culturebox Lounge Team (DK)
 Datarock (N)
 Death By Kite (DK)
 Decorate. Decorate. (DK) 
 Detektivbyrån (S) 
 Digital Mystikz, Loefah & MC Sgt Pokes (UK)
 Diplo (US)
 Dizzee Rascal (UK) (Friday)
 Djuma Soundsystem (DK)
 The Downward Candiddate (DK)
 Dream of an Opium Eater (UK/N)
 Dusty (D)
 Thomas Dybdahl (N)
 Dúné (DK)
 Electrelane (UK)
 Roky Erickson (US)
 Fanfare Ciocarlia (ROM)
 The Floor is Made of Lava (DK)
 Forest & Crispian (S)
 Gadens Historie (DK/S)
 Holly Golightly (UK)
 Gojira (FR)
 Goose (BEL)
 Gorilla Angreb (DK)
 Grizzly Bear (US)
 A Hawk and a Hacksaw (US)
 Hayseed Dixie (US)
 Highway Child (DK)
 In Flames (S)
 Jeans Team (D)
 John Legend (US)
 Camille Jones (DK)
 Junkyard Productions (DK)
 Kal (SER)
 Kama Aina (JAP)
 Kasai Allstars (CON)
 Katatonia (S)
 Nikaido Kazumi (JAP)
 The Killers (US) (Thursday)
 The Kissaway Trail (DK)
 Klaxons (UK) (Friday)
 Kloak (DK)
 Bassekou Kouyate & Ngoni Ba (MALI)
 Seun Kuti and Egypt '80 (NIG)
 K'Naan (SOM)
 Lazee (S)
 LCD Soundsystem (US)
 The Lionheart Brothers (N)
 Høgni Lisberg (FO)
 Loney, Dear (S)
 Luomo (FIN)
 DJ Lychee (CHN)
 DJ Lasse Lyngbo (DK)
 M.A.N.D.Y. Patrick (D)
 Machine Head (US)
 Maher Shalal Hash Baz (JAP)
 Mando Diao (S)
 Mani Spinx (DK) 
 Mapei (S)
 Marybell Katastrophy (DK)
 Mastodon (US)
 Matias & Løwenstein (DK)
 Matmos (US)
 Mikkel Metal (DK)
 Moi Caprice (DK)
 Nicolai Molbech (DK)
 Murder (DK)
 Muse (UK) (Sunday)
 Mustasch (S)
 Musicians of the Nile (EGY)
 My Chemical Romance (US)
 The National (US)
 Nephew (DK)
 New Young Pony Club (UK)
 Nika Soup & Saya Source (JAP)
 Nortec Collective (MEX)
 Nostalgia 77 Octet (UK)
 Ben Nott (UK)
 Oh No Ono (DK)
 Mikael Palner (DK)
 Mungal Patasar & Pantar (TRIN)
 Pelican (US)
 People Press Play (DK)
 Lee Scratch Perry & Adrian Sherwood (JAM/UK)
 Peter Bjorn and John (S)
 Pixel (DK)
 The Psyke Project (DK)
 Queens of the Stone Age (US) (Friday)
 Quit Your Dayjob (S)
 Red Hot Chili Peppers (US) (Saturday)
 Rhonda Harris (DK)
 Ronin & Marone (DK)
 Alice Rose (DK)
 Martin Rostbøl (DK)
 Darko Rundek & Cargo Orkester (INT)
 Mike Sheridan (DK)
 Sonic Junior (BRA)
 Kasper Spez (DK)
 Sort Stue Med Piratkor (DK)
 The Sounds (S)
 Speaker Bite Me (DK)
 Stella Polaris Soundsystem (DK)
 Stones Throw Records: Peanut Butter Wolf, J. Rocc, Aloe Blacc, Percee P & Guilty Simpson (US)
 Strike Anywhere (US)
 Suspekt (DK)
 Taxi Taxi! (S)
 Tenniscoats (JAP)
 The Thermals (US)
 Timbuktu & Damn! (S)
 Tiësto (NL)
 Transmission Low (DK)
 Trentemøller (DK)
 Trost (D)
 True Tiger presents Ny, Purple Simba, Bruza, Faith SFX & Scandalous Unltd. (UK)
 Tunng (UK)
 Turboweekend(DK)
 Ungdomskulen (N)
 Volbeat (DK)
 The Whitest Boy Alive (N/D)
 The Who (UK)
 Wilco (US)
 X-Alfonso (CUB)
 Zyklon (N)

Cancelled concerts
 Cold War Kids (US)
 Mika (UK)
 Slayer (US)
 Explosions in the Sky (US)
 Eagles of Death Metal (US)

References

External links

Roskilde Festival by year
2007 in Danish music
2007 music festivals